Ethylammonium nitrate or ethylamine nitrate (EAN) is a salt with formula  . It is an odorless and colorless to slightly yellowish liquid with a melting point of 12 °C. This compound was described by Paul Walden in 1914, and is believed to be the earliest reported example of a room-temperature ionic liquid.

Synthesis and properties
Ethylammonium nitrate can be produced by heating ethyl nitrate with an alcoholic solution of ammonia or by reacting ethylamine with concentrated nitric acid. It has a relatively low viscosity of 0.28 poise or 0.028 Pa·s at 25 °C and therefore a high electrical conductivity of about 20 mS·cm−1 at 25 °C. It boils at 240 °C and decomposes at about 250 °C. Its density at 20 °C is 1.261 g/cm3. 

The ethylammonium ion has three easily detachable protons which are tetrahedrally arranged around the central nitrogen atom, whereas the configuration of the  anion is planar. Despite the structural differences, EAN shares many properties with water, such as micelle formation, aggregation of hydrocarbons, negative enthalpy and entropy of dissolution of gases, etc. Similar to water, EAN can form three-dimensional hydrogen bonding networks.

Applications
Ethylammonium nitrate is used as an electrically conductive solvent in electrochemistry and as a protein crystallization agent. It has a positive effect on the refolding of denaturated lysozyme, with the refolding yield of about 90%. The refolding action was explained as follows: The ethyl group of ethylammonium nitrate interacts with the hydrophobic part of the protein and thereby protects it from intermolecular association, whereas the charged part of EAN stabilizes the electrostatic interactions.

References

Ammonium compounds
Nitrates
Ionic liquids
Substances discovered in the 1910s